Canoe polo was part of the World Games from the edition of Duisburg 2005.

Medalists

Men

Women

References 
 
 
 
 

 
World Games
Canoe polo